The 1963–64 Kansas Jayhawks men's basketball team represented the University of Kansas during the 1963–64 college men's basketball season.

Roster
George Unseld
Steve Renko
Harry Gibson
Walt Wesley
Al Correll
Dave Schichtle
Del Lewis
Riney Lochmann
Robert Buddy Vance
Wayne Loving
Dave Brill
Fred Chana
Kerry Bolton
Jim Gough
Richard Ruggles
Jay Roberts
Sherman Stimley

Schedule

References

Kansas Jayhawks men's basketball seasons
Kansas State
Kansas
Kansas